Mikko Holm (18 March 1890 – 17 March 1975) was a Finnish wrestler. He competed in the middleweight event at the 1912 Summer Olympics.

References

External links
 

1890 births
1975 deaths
Olympic wrestlers of Finland
Wrestlers at the 1912 Summer Olympics
Finnish male sport wrestlers
People from Outokumpu
Sportspeople from North Karelia